Securigera orientalis is an ornamental plant native to the Caucasus region of Asia.

References

 

orientalis
Plants described in 1808